Ioannis Dimakopoulos (born 7 November 1994) is a Greek-Australian professional basketball player for Albacete Basket of the LEB Oro. He is also contracted with the Joondalup Wolves of the NBL1 West. Listed as 7'2" (2.18 m), he plays the center position.

Early life
Dimakopoulos was born in Patras, Greece. He played for the junior teams of Panathinaikos between 2008 and 2012. He participated in the 2010 Jordan Brand Classic in Istanbul, Turkey.

In 2012, Dimakopoulos moved to the United States to attend Cathedral High School in Los Angeles, California. He was a 2013 McDonald's All-American nominee.

College career
After high school, Dimakopoulos played four years of NCAA Division I college basketball for the UC Irvine Anteaters. As a senior in 2016–17, he was named to the All-Big West Conference Second Team.

Professional career
On 7 September 2017, Dimakopoulos signed with the Greek club Kolossos Rodou. Two weeks later, he was released from the club for "personal reasons". The following month, he had a two-game stint with Panionios. In December 2017, he joined Spanish club Baskonia B.

For the 2018–19 season, Dimakopoulos played for Apollon Patras. He then played for AEL Limassol in Cyprus in 2019–20.

On 23 December 2020, Dimakopoulos signed with Aris Leeuwarden of the Dutch Basketball League for the season restart in January 2021.

For the 2021–22 season, Dimakopoulos played for Spanish club Almansa.

In June 2022, Dimakopoulos joined the Eastern Mavericks of the NBL1 Central in Australia. He averaged 19.2 points per game.

For the 2022–23 season, Dimakopoulos had a one-game stint with MBK Handlová in Slovakia before playing 14 games for UBSC Graz between 2 October and 29 December. He joined Spanish club Albacete Basket in January 2023.

On 8 March 2023, Dimakopoulos signed with the Joondalup Wolves in Australia for the 2023 NBL1 West season.

National team career
Dimakopoulos was a member of the Greek junior national teams. He played at the 2010 FIBA Europe Under-16 Championship and the 2011 FIBA Europe Under-18 Championship.

Personal life
Dimakopoulos is the son of Dimitris  and Aikaterina Dimakopoulos. His father played professional basketball and represented the Greek national team. His mother was born in Australia.

Dimakopoulos holds an Australian passport and has dual Greek-Australian citizenship.

References

External links
FIBA Archive profile
FIBA Europe profile
Greek Basket League profile 
Greek Basket League profile 
UC Irvine college bio

1994 births
Living people
AEL Limassol B.C. players
Apollon Patras B.C. players
Aris Leeuwarden players
Australian men's basketball players
Basketball players from Patras
Centers (basketball)
Dutch Basketball League players
Greek men's basketball players
Panionios B.C. players
Power forwards (basketball)
UC Irvine Anteaters men's basketball players